Gerdian (also Romanized as Gerdīān and Gerdeyān; also known as Ḩasanābād and Kordīyān) is a village in Khezel-e Sharqi Rural District, Khezel District, Nahavand County, Hamadan Province, Iran. At the 2006 census, its population was 602, in 145 families.

References 

Populated places in Nahavand County